Shake Down is the debut studio album by the British blues rock band Savoy Brown.  It was released in 1967 (on Decca SKL 4883) under the name of Savoy Brown Blues Band and is mainly an album of covers, featuring three songs penned by blues singer Willie Dixon.  In addition to Dixon, the band covers John Lee Hooker and B.B. King.  (The album was not originally issued in the US, but was available as an import, until released on CD in 1990)

Track listing

 "I Ain't Superstitious" (Willie Dixon) – 3:25
 "Let Me Love You Baby" (Dixon) – 3:00
 "Black Night" (Jessie Mae Robinson) – 4:47
 "High Rise" (Beverly Bridge, Sonny Thompson, Freddie King) – 2:44
 "Rock Me Baby" (B.B. King, Joe Josea) – 2:56
 "I Smell Trouble" (Deadric Malone) – 4:28
 "Oh! Pretty Woman" (Albert King) – 2:28
 "Little Girl" (Dixon) – 1:38 (credited incorrectly to Willie Dixon; written in 1954 by Chester Burnett as "I Have a Little Girl")
 "The Doormouse Rides the Rails" (Martin Stone) – 3:32
 "It's My Own Fault" (John Lee Hooker) – 4:55 (listed incorrectly on label as "It's All My Fault"; corrected on sleeve as "It's My Own Fault")
 "Shake 'Em On Down" (Traditional, arranged by Bob Hall and Savoy Brown) – 6:00

Personnel

Savoy Brown
 Brice Portius – vocals
 Kim Simmonds – lead and rhythm guitar
 Martin Stone – lead and rhythm guitar
 Ray Chappell – bass
 Leo Mannings – drums, percussion
 Bob Hall – piano on "I Ain't Superstitious", "Little Girl" and "Shake 'Em On Down"

Technical
 Mike Vernon – producer
 Gus Dudgeon – recording engineer
 Guy Fletcher – mastering engineer
 Neil Slaven – liner notes

References

External links
Savoy Brown's Homepage
"Shake Down" at discogs

1967 debut albums
Savoy Brown albums
Albums produced by Mike Vernon (record producer)
Decca Records albums